Schoeppingk is a Baltic German noble family.

The Schoeppingk family lived in Westphalia the 13th century,  migrated in the 15th century to Courland, and on 17 October 1620, were included in the list of Courland nobility. In 1818 the head of the family was created Baron of the Russian Empire.

Prominent members include:
 Ernst Dietrich Freiherr op dem Hamme genannt Schoeppingk (Dmitry) - after Courland became part of the Russian empire, was appointed to the Privy Council. 
 Magnus Friedrich Freiherr op dem Hamme genannt Schoeppingk - (Fyodor Dmitryevich; d. 1855) - Privy Councillor
 Otto Friedrich Freiherr op dem Hamme genannt Schoeppingk (1790—1874) - Major-General.
 Baron Dmitry Ottovich Shepping (1823—1895) - Russian historian, archaeologist, ethnographer
 Juliane Anna Elisabeth Gräfin von der Pahlen, born Freiin op dem Hamme genannt Schoeppingk (1751—1814) - wife of Peter Ludwig von der Pahlen

References

Russian noble families
Baltic nobility